Leck Kill is an unincorporated community in Northumberland County, Pennsylvania, United States. Leck Kill had a post office from January 30, 1872, until January 3, 2004; it still has its own ZIP Code, 17836.

Leck Kill had an elementary school until 2013, when the Line Mountain School District closed the school and sent students elsewhere in the district. Its former school building opened in 1927. The community was home to a tavern and a mill in the nineteenth century.

References

Unincorporated communities in Northumberland County, Pennsylvania
Unincorporated communities in Pennsylvania